Yaya or Piyade were infantry military units of the Ottoman Empire and some other medieval Anatolian beyliks. Many of them were of Christian origin.

Name 
Yaya means "pedestrian" in Ottoman Turkish. It is of Turkic origin word. An alternative name, piyade, is derived from a Persian word with the same meaning. This latter name was also used in the series of dynasties that ruled the neighboring Persian state.

Background 
The early Ottoman military forces consisted of irregular nomadic cavalry and volunteer light infantry. These units were efficient against local Byzantine feudal lords but were unable to capture fortified castles by direct assault. This was the reason for Alaeddin Pasha including the establishment of this unit in his proposal for reorganization the military of the Ottoman Empire made in the mid 1320s. His brother, sultan Orhan, accepted his proposal and established yaya.

Yaya were precursors of the Janissary corps of the Ottoman military, which would become one of the most influential and increasingly political forces in the Ottoman state until the 19th century. Janissary Corps would be made of converted Christians from Balkans up to 1500(most of them Albanians, Bosnians and Eastern Romans). However, by 1550s when the Devshirme was abolished " de facto" , the Janissary Corps would be dominated by Muslim born Ottomans, majority of them being Muslim Albanians.

Organization 
The commander of the Yaya unit was referred to as Yayabashi. Members of this units were both Christian and Muslim citizens of the Ottoman Empire who were sometimes granted land estates in the Balkans in exchange for military service. They were most irregular infantry Ottoman units because they usually served as armed laborers whose military skills were limited. Still, before Janissary units were established and expanded in 1380s and afterwards, yaya peasant infantry had important military function. By giving regular salary to yaya Ottomans acquired a standing army.

Engagements 
Among notable engagements of yaya military units are battles of Marica (1371) and Nicopolis (1396) where Ottoman infantry units, including yaya, were used to bait enemy heavy cavalry into an ambush between two flanks of more maneuverable light Ottoman cavalry.

References 

Military units and formations of the Ottoman Empire
Infantry units and formations
Janissaries
14th-century establishments in the Ottoman Empire
Ottoman period in the Balkans